Pull the Plug is the debut album by drum and bass act London Elektricity, released in June 1999 through Hospital Records.

The track "Rewind" was inspired by 4hero's mix of "Blackgold Of The Sun" and features vocals by Liane Carroll, a jazz-folk singer from Hastings, South England. She also appears on "Do You Believe", which is a cover version and tribute to the Webster Lewis 23-minute original.

Track listing

References 

1999 debut albums
London Elektricity albums
Hospital Records albums